Colossal is a 2016 science fiction black comedy film directed and written by Nacho Vigalondo. The film stars Anne Hathaway, Jason Sudeikis, Dan Stevens, Austin Stowell, and Tim Blake Nelson. The film follows an unemployed writer who unwittingly manifests a giant creature in Seoul while struggling with alcoholism and an abusively controlling colleague.

The film is an international co-production between producers in Canada, Spain, the United States and South Korea. Anne Hathaway signed onto the project in May 2015, which was described as "Godzilla meets Lost in Translation". Prior to the start of filming, Toho brought a lawsuit against Voltage Pictures, the film's producers, for unauthorized usage of Godzilla's image. However, a settlement was reached in October, 2015. Principal photography began on October 18, 2015 and primarily took place in and around Vancouver, British Columbia, finishing on November 25, 2015.

Colossal held its world premiere at the Toronto International Film Festival on 9 September 2016 and was followed by several festival screenings. It was theatrically released in the United States on April 7, 2017 by Neon, in South Korea on April 20 by Dreamfact Entertainment, in Canada on April 21 by Mongrel Media, and in Spain on June 30 by Versus Entertainment; it aired a day earlier, on June 29, on Movistar Estrenos as an exclusive preview. The film received positive reviews, with praise for the acting, direction, screenplay, and themes. Hathaway and Sudeikis were singled out by many critics for particular acclaim. The film grossed $4.5 million worldwide against a production budget of $15 million.

Plot
Gloria is an unemployed writer struggling with alcoholism. Her boyfriend Tim, frustrated with her behavior, breaks up with her and kicks her out of their New York City apartment. Moving back to her family home in Mainhead, New Hampshire, Gloria reunites with her childhood friend Oscar, who now runs his late father's bar. Oscar warmly welcomes Gloria and offers her a job at the bar, which she accepts.

Working at the bar aggravates Gloria's alcoholism, often drinking with Oscar and his friends, Garth and Joel, until morning, then sleeps it off in her nearly empty childhood home. At the same time, a giant reptilian monster appears in Seoul, leaving death and destruction in its wake. Gloria realizes when she walks through a local playground at exactly 8:05 am, she causes the monster to manifest and can remotely control it.

Gloria shares her discovery with Oscar and his friends by dancing in the playground while they watch a newsfeed of the monster mimicking her movements. A helicopter launches a missile at the monster, causing Gloria pain. Gloria lashes out, destroying the helicopter, and killing the pilots. Horrified at what she’s done, she collapses, causing widespread destruction. She awakens to find that a delighted Oscar also manifested in Seoul, but as a giant robot. Gloria tries to make amends by having the monster spell out an apology in Korean, to the delight of the South Korean people and media, and begins avoiding both the playground and alcohol.

After spending the night with Joel, Gloria discovers a drunken Oscar controlling the robot to taunt South Korea. After a tense confrontation, she makes him leave. Oscar thinks something happened between Gloria and Joel, becoming jealous. That night, he drunkenly insults his friends at the bar and demands Gloria have a beer, threatening to return to the playground if she refuses. The next morning, a sober Oscar apologizes to Gloria.

Tim pays a visit to Gloria, but is irritated by her living situation before apologizing. Upon meeting Tim at the bar, Oscar provokes a confrontation by setting off fireworks indoors. Tim tries to get Gloria to leave with him, but she stays to curb Oscar's destructive behavior. Oscar visits Gloria’s house to prevent her from leaving, and Gloria recalls their childhood; as a child, Gloria made a paper diorama of Seoul as a school project, which was blown into what would later become the playground; a young Oscar retrieved it, but destroyed it out of jealousy. Gloria's anger triggered lightning which strikes both of them, as well as their toys; Gloria’s being a reptilian monster; Oscar’s being a robot.

In the present, Gloria recognizes that Oscar's manipulative behavior arises from his self hatred at never having amounted to anything; the robot manifests as his way of making himself feel important. After deciding to leave town, Gloria races Oscar for the playground. Oscar incapacitates her and destroys a large portion of Seoul, killing hundreds of people. Oscar warns Gloria that for every day she’s not with him, he will commence further rampages.

Shortly after, Gloria makes a trip to South Korea, apologizing to Tim over the phone, but says she owes him no explanations as he had ended their relationship.  At 8:05 am in the US, Oscar carries out his threat, making his robot manifest in Seoul. Gloria walks towards it in Seoul, making her monster appear at the playground back home. Gloria’s monster catches Oscar and flings him over the horizon, causing the robot to disappear. Gloria retreats to a bar and asks the bartender if she would like to hear an amazing story. The bartender says yes, and offers Gloria a drink, at which Gloria sighs.

Cast

 Anne Hathaway as Gloria
 Hannah Cheramy as young Gloria
 Jason Sudeikis as Oscar, Gloria's childhood friend
 Nathan Ellison as young Oscar
 Dan Stevens as Tim, Gloria's ex-boyfriend
 Austin Stowell as Joel
 Tim Blake Nelson as Garth
 Rukiya Bernard as Marie
 Agam Darshi as Ash

Production
Hathaway was the first actress to sign on at a time when the project had no financial backing. Hathaway heard about the script after finding herself "in a little bit of an artistic no man's land" for inspiration. Director Jonathan Demme screened for her a copy of A Field in England, after which Hathaway decided that it represented exactly the type of movie she wanted to make. After asking her representation to see a similar script that she could join, she was sent the Colossal script. Hathaway found herself attracted to the genre-hopping nature of the script, later comparing it to Being John Malkovich, one of her favorite films.

Prior to the start of filming, Japanese company Toho brought a lawsuit against Voltage Pictures for unauthorized usage of Godzilla's image and stills from previous Godzilla films in emails and press documents sent to potential investors. A settlement was reached that October.

Principal photography on the film also began in Vancouver on October 18, 2015, and ended on November 25, 2015. No motion captured footage was used for the creation of the monster; rather, footage of Hathaway acting out her parts was given to the CG team, who used this as reference points. The CG artists, as opposed to Vigalondo, were responsible for the look of the monster itself. Vigalondo stated that this was partly due to his lack of artistic skill and partly due to him "[wanting] them to feel like characters that felt like a part of the genre we're playing with".

Release
The film had its world premiere at the Toronto International Film Festival on September 9, 2016. Shortly after, an unnamed Chinese company acquired distribution rights to the film, which was later announced as Neon, a newly-founded distribution company. It held its European premiere at the San Sebastián International Film Festival on September 19, 2016. The film was selected as the closing screening for Fantastic Fest at the Alamo Drafthouse South Lamar on September 29, 2016, where it was awarded Best Picture in the Fantastic Features section. It was screened at the Sitges Film Festival on October 7, 2016. The film went on to screen at the Sundance Film Festival on January 20, 2017, and at South by Southwest on March 10, 2017. The film began a limited theatrical release in the United States on April 7, 2017. In South Korea, the film was released on April 20 by Dreamfact Entertainment. It was released in Canadian theaters the following day, on April 21, by Mongrel Media. In Spain, the film was co-distributed by Versus Entertainment and Movistar+. It premiered as an exclusive preview on June 29, 2017 on Movistar Estrenos before it was released theatrically the following day, on June 30, by Versus Entertainment.

Reception

Box office
Colossal earned $3 million in the United States and Canada and $1.5 million in other territories for a total international gross of $4.5 million against a production budget of $15 million.

Colossal earned $120,226 in its opening weekend from four theaters at an average of $30,056 per theater, finishing twenty-ninth at the box office. The film grew by 278% in its second weekend, grossing $454,258 in 98 theaters and finishing in #17. In its third weekend, the film grew again by 35%. earning $615,089 in 239 theaters. By its fourth weekend, the film crossed $2 million domestically, earning $563,344 on 326 screens, averaging $1,728 per theater. The film made its international debut in South Korea on April 21, 2017, where it grossed $50,712 (₩57,518,565) in 294 theaters.

Critical response
On review aggregator website Rotten Tomatoes, the film has an approval rating of 81% based on 259 reviews, with an average rating of 7.17/10. The site's critical consensus reads, "Colossals singular strangeness can be disorienting, but viewers who hang on may find that its genre-defying execution—and Anne Hathaway's performance—is well worth the ride." On Metacritic, the film has a score of 70 out of 100, based on 36 critics, indicating "generally favorable reviews".

Writing for RogerEbert.com, Matt Zoller Seitz awarded Colossal 3.5 out of 4 stars, stating "I'll just say that the cast is quietly superb, that the movie always knows what it is and what it wants to say." IGN awarded it 7.0 out of 10, saying "It isn't always successful, but when the film works, it's a blast—another completely original and unique genre mash-up from the mad mind of Nacho Vigalondo." Peter Travers of Rolling Stone awarded it 3.5 out of 4, saying "Colossal is seriously unmissable".

Jake Coyle writing for the Associated Press gave it 2 out of 4 stars, saying "The one-trick act of 'Colossal' becomes tiresome even as its leads—particularly an excellent Hathaway—work to find some depth in the story." Mark Jenkins of NPR said "The longer the movie runs, the more its novelty fades. The tone wavers, and plot holes that appeared small at the halfway point start looking like chasms." Rex Reed of The New York Observer gave it 0 out of 4 stars, saying the film was "almost as unwatchable as it [sic] incomprehensible".

Lawsuit
As the film's director claimed the film was "The Cheapest Godzilla movie ever made," and showed photos of the character in its showing at the Cannes Film Festival, Godzilla's copyright owner, Toho, was not pleased. As a result of a settlement of the lawsuit which took place before the film was even released, the film's location was moved from Tokyo to Seoul, South Korea, and that the movie would not use a derivative of Godzilla.

References

External links

 
 
 

2016 films
2016 black comedy films
2016 science fiction films

2010s American films
2010s Canadian films
2010s English-language films
2010s Japanese films
2010s monster movies
2010s science fiction comedy films
2010s South Korean films
2010s Spanish films

American black comedy films
American monster movies
American science fiction comedy films
Brightlight Pictures films
Canadian black comedy films
Canadian monster movies
Canadian science fiction comedy films
English-language Canadian films
English-language South Korean films
English-language Spanish films
Films about alcoholism
Films about giants
Films about writers
Films directed by Nacho Vigalondo
Films scored by Bear McCreary
Films set in New York City
Films set in Seoul
Films shot in Seoul
Films shot in Vancouver
Giant monster films
Kaiju films
South Korean black comedy films
South Korean science fiction comedy films
Spanish black comedy films
Spanish monster movies
Spanish science fiction comedy films
Voltage Pictures films
Works subject to a lawsuit